Mohammad Yasin Shah (  23 April 2020) was an Indian politician and the former member of the Jammu and Kashmir Legislative Assembly. A member of Jammu and Kashmir National Conference, he started his political career from Hazratbal constituency in 1987 and later, represented Sonawar constituency in 1996 and subsequently served as political adviser to the then chief minister, Farooq Abdullah. Prior to his participation in assembly elections, he served as councillor of the Srinagar Municipal Corporation.

In 2002, he was again elected from the Sonawari constituency. In 2009, Farooq Abdullah was elected as the member of parliament, making the constituency become vacant in 2009 and he retained his position again via by-election.

References 

1970 births
2020 deaths
Jammu & Kashmir National Conference politicians
Jammu and Kashmir MLAs 1987–1996
Jammu and Kashmir MLAs 2002–2008
Jammu and Kashmir MLAs 2008–2014
Place of birth missing